Neve Joseph Grice (4 May 1881 – 21 April 1950), sometimes known as Neville Grice, was an English amateur footballer who made one appearance in the Football League for Woolwich Arsenal as an outside left.

Personal life 
Grice was married with a son.

Career statistics

References 

1881 births
1950 deaths
People from Brentford
English footballers
Association football outside forwards
English Football League players
Southern Football League players
Arsenal F.C. players
Brentford F.C. players